Pushnoy (masculine), Pushnaya (feminine), or Pushnoye (neuter) is the name of several rural localities in Russia:
Pushnoy, Republic of Karelia, a settlement in Belomorsky District of the Republic of Karelia
Pushnoy, Murmansk Oblast, an inhabited locality in Pushnovsky Territorial Okrug of Kolsky District in Murmansk Oblast
Pushnoy, Novosibirsk Oblast, a settlement in Cherepanovsky District of Novosibirsk Oblast
Pushnoye, Republic of Khakassia, a selo in Pushnovsky Selsoviet of Bogradsky District in the Republic of Khakassia
Pushnoye, Leningrad Oblast, a logging depot settlement under the administrative jurisdiction of Roshchinskoye Settlement Municipal Formation in Vyborgsky District of Leningrad Oblast